Pupa solidula, common name the solid pupa, is a species of small sea snail, a marine gastropod mollusc in the family Acteonidae.  .

Description
The size of the shell varies between 15 mm and 40 mm.

The thick shell is ovate, oblong and cylindrical. It shows slightly impressed, transverse striae, traversed by oblong, brown spots, and often intermixed with other reddish spots, especially upon the whorls. A narrow, white band, surrounds towards the middle, the lowest whorl. The conical spire is pointed. The oblong aperture is narrowed, a little compressed towards its upper third, and dilated at its lower part. Two folds upon the columella, are separated by quite a deep, semicircular groove, the larger, two-lobed.

Distribution
This marine species occurs in the tropical Indo-West Pacific.

References

 Linnaeus, C. 1758. Systema Naturae per Regna tria Naturae, secundem Classes, Ordines, Genera, Species, cum Characteribus, Differentis, Synonymis, Locis. Tom.1 Editio decima, reformata. Holmiae : Laurentii Salvii 824 pp..
 Willan, R.C. 2005. The molluscan fauna from the emergent reefs of the northernmost Sahul Shelf, Timor Sea — Ashmore, Cartier and Hibernia Reefs; biodiversity and zoogeography. pp. 51–81 in Russell, B.C. et al. (eds). Understanding the Cultural and Natural Heritage values and Management Challenges of the Ashmore Region. The Beagle, Records of the Museums and Art Galleries of the Northern Territory Suppl. 1: 248 pp. 
 Poppe G. (2010) Philippine marine mollusks volume 3. 665 pp., pls 708–1014. Hackenheim: Conchbooks.

External links
 

Acteonidae
Gastropods described in 1758
Taxa named by Carl Linnaeus